Matlwang is a small rural village west of Potchefstroom, North West province in South Africa.

References

Populated places in the JB Marks Local Municipality